2003 Saudi-Egyptian Super Cup, the 2nd and last Saudi-Egyptian Super Cup, league and cup champions from each Saudi Arabia and Egypt qualified, the four teams were drawn into two ties, In each tie, the two teams played an annual match, the cups winners participated on President Mubarak's Cup Winners' Super Cup, the leagues winners participated on King Fahd's League Winners' Super Cup.

Qualified teams

Matches

King Fahd's Cup Winners' Super Cup

President Mubarak's League Winners' Super Cup

References 
 :ar:كأس السوبر المصري السعودى
 
 https://archive.today/20131122173126/http://yyy.ahram.org.eg/archive/2003/7/25/SPOR26.HTM
 https://web.archive.org/web/20131115115313/http://saihat.net/vb/archive/index.php/t-48686.html

S
Cup
Cup